Grethe Andersen (born 8 March 1966) is a Norwegian politician for the Progress Party.

In the 2017 election she was elected as a deputy representative to the Parliament of Norway from Nordland. Hailing from Meløy, she made her local breakthrough as board member of Nordland Progress Party in 2010.

References

1966 births
Living people
People from Meløy
Progress Party (Norway) politicians
Nordland politicians
Deputy members of the Storting
Women members of the Storting